The Cairo Bulletin began publication in Cairo, Illinois, on December 21, 1868. Founded by John H. Oberly and Company (as the Cairo Evening Bulletin), it was one of only a few newspapers being published in Southern Illinois during its early run. Oberly meant for the newspaper to be “a new organ of Democratic sentiment,” and covered news, politics, and literature for the whole area.

The Cairo Bulletin has had several name changes during its long run, and is still in publication today, titled The Cairo Citizen.

Issues for years 1868-1884 have been digitized and are available for free online at Chronicling America and the Illinois Digital Newspaper Collections.

References

External links 
 Chronicling America: The Cairo Bulletin
 Illinois Digital Newspaper Collections: The Cairo Bulletin (1868-1884)

Newspapers published in Illinois
Cairo, Illinois